Georges Leygues (D640) was the lead ship of the F70 type anti-submarine frigate of the French Marine Nationale. The French Navy does not use the term "destroyer" for its ships; hence some large ships, referred to as "frigates", are registered as destroyers. She was the second French vessel named after the 19–20th century politician and Navy Minister, Georges Leygues. She was the tender for the former helicopter cruiser Jeanne d'Arc.

Service history
In 1981, Georges Leygues and the fleet escort Guépratte, cruising in front of an Allied fleet during training sessions, detected a Soviet submarine, which they chased for 19 hours.

The same year, Georges Leygues intervened when the Iranian ship Tabarzin was captured by a commando hostile to the new regime, and sailed to France. The commando reached France and requested political refugee status, while the ship was returned to Iran.

In 1987, France and Iran having broken off diplomatic relations, Georges Leygues escorted commercial ships in the Persian Gulf.

In 1992, Georges Leygues took part in Operation Restore Hope in Somalia.

In 1999, she was partially modified to accommodate student officers, and started tending the cruiser Jeanne d'Arc in the context of the training voyages of the French Naval Academy. The same year, after catastrophic flooding occurred in Mozambique the two ships were re-routed to deliver humanitarian aid.

In early 2004, after the 2004 Haitian coup d'état, Jeanne d'Arc and Georges Leygues were re-routed to assist in the French intervention there. In December the same year, the two ships intervened in Indonesia after the 2004 Indian Ocean earthquake. In 2011, the frigate took part in the evacuation of the civilians from Tunisia. The ship was decommissioned on 21 March 2014.

References

Georges Leygues-class frigates
Frigates of France
1976 ships
Ships built in France